Haage Summane is a 2008 Kannada-language film directed by Preetham Gubbi. Kiran Srinivas and Suhasi played the lead roles. Music was composed by Mano Murthy. The film released nationwide on 26 December 2008.

Cast
Kiran Srinivas as Preetham
Suhasi Dhami as Khushi
Pooja Gandhi (cameo appearance)
Chandrashekar
Sharath Babu

Soundtrack
The film has six songs composed by Mano Murthy with the lyrics penned by Jayant Kaikini.

Reception

Critical response 

R G Vijayasarathy of Rediff.com scored the film at 3 out of 5 stars and wrote "Newcomers Kiran and Suhasi are the find of the season. Both look good on screen and prove that they can act. Yesteryear hero Edakallu Guddadhamele Chandrashekhar and Sharath Babu do well. Yamuna is a good choice for the role of heroine's mother. Haage Summane is a candyfloss love story, worth a watch".
A critic from Bangalore Mirror wrote  "Sharat Babu and K S L Swamee are wasted in their roles. Excessive viewing of chocolate -faced Kiran and Suhasi in the film may put you off good-looking people for sometime".

Awards
FilmFare Award for Best Cinematographer  S Krishna.

References

External links
Official website
listen songs online

2000s Kannada-language films
2008 films
Films scored by Mano Murthy
Films directed by Preetham Gubbi